Michael Graeme Groom  (born 1959) is an Australian mountain climber. In 1995, Groom became the fourth person ever to reach the summits of the four highest mountains in the world (Lhotse, Kangchenjunga, K2 and Everest) without the aid of bottled oxygen. He proceeded to climb the fifth-highest, Makalu, in 1999. In 1987 he lost the front third of his feet to frostbite after descending from the summit of Kangchenjunga. Despite this, he later managed to summit Mount Everest in 1993 and again in 1996. 

Groom acted as a guide for Adventure Consultants during the 1996 Mount Everest disaster, which he survived and subsequently described in his 1997 autobiography. In the 2015 film Everest, Groom was portrayed by actor Tom Wright.

In the 2000 Australia Day Honours Groom was awarded the Medal of the Order of Australia (OAM) for "service to mountaineering".

Notable ascents

Everest
On his third attempt at summiting the tallest mountain in the world in 1993, Groom finally completed Everest without the use of supplemental oxygen. He attempted twice in 1991, the second time ending in a  fall down the Lhotse Face in an avalanche; he received only a broken nose and a few cracked ribs and was lucky to have survived the ordeal.

K2
In 1995, Groom unknowingly turned around just  shy of the summit of K2 after taking the more difficult and technically demanding SSE Spur route. He returned weeks later and successfully summited the mountain via the easier Abruzzi ridge with Veikka Gustafsson.

Kangchenjunga
In 1987 Groom summited Kanchenjunga (the world's third-highest mountain at 8598m) but on descending developed frostbite in the toes of both feet, later resulting in partial amputation of both feet.

Makalu
In 1999 he climbed Makalu, the world's fifth-highest mountain.

Bibliography
 Sheer Will: The Inspiring Life and Climbs of Michael Groom. An Autobiography 1997 Random House Australia

See also
List of people with surname Groom
List of Mount Everest summiters by number of times to the summit
List of Mount Everest guides

References

External links
Michael Groom - The Official Website
Contact Michael for Speaking engagements

1959 births
Australian mountain climbers
Living people
Australian summiters of Mount Everest
Recipients of the Medal of the Order of Australia